Old Cassop is a hamlet in County Durham, in England. It is situated a few miles to the south-east of Durham. Old Cassop lies within the Cassop-cum-Quarrington civil parish.

Old Cassop is about a quarter of a mile south of the A181 road and is accessible only by an unclassified single-track road.  It is covered by a conservation area to preserve its character.

External links

Villages in County Durham